Bad Beat is a 2012 American short drama film, written and directed by Nicholas Conde and produced by the Kings Gambit. The film appeared in competition at the 2012 Campus Moviefest at the University of South Florida where it was awarded Best Drama before proceeding to the national competition in Hollywood.

References

2010s English-language films